Pelalawan is a regency (kabupaten) of Riau Province, Indonesia. It is located on the island of Sumatra. The regency has an area of 13,067.29 km² and had a population of 301,829 at the 2010 Census and 390,046 at the 2020 Census, including 201,685 male and 188,361 female. The administrative centre is at the town of Pangkalan Kerinci.

Administrative districts 
The regency is divided into twelve districts (kecamatan), listed below with their areas and their populations at the 2010 Census and the 2020 Census. The table also includes the locations of the district administrative centres, and the number of villages (rural desa and urban kelurahan) in each district; of the 14 kelurahan, one (the district administrative centre) was in each district, except that Pangkalan Kerinci had 3 kelurahan.

References

Regencies of Riau